Old Persian is a Unicode block containing cuneiform characters for writing the Old Persian language of the Achaemenid Empire.

History
The following Unicode-related documents record the purpose and process of defining specific characters in the Old Persian block:

References 

Unicode blocks